Monuments and Melodies is the first greatest hits compilation album by American rock band Incubus released on June 16, 2009, through Epic Records. It is released as a double-disc set, the first disc features 13 previously released singles from the albums Make Yourself, Morning View, A Crow Left of the Murder..., and Light Grenades, along with two new Brendan O'Brien–produced tracks, "Black Heart Inertia" and "Midnight Swim".

The second disc is a collection of rarities including B-sides, soundtrack cuts, alternate versions, three previously unreleased songs, and a cover of Prince's "Let's Go Crazy".  The album takes its title from a song that was originally released as the B-side to "Megalomaniac" and as a bonus track on international releases of A Crow Left of the Murder...; it is also included on Disc 2 of this album.

Track listing

Disc 1 (Monuments)

Disc 2  (Melodies)
{{Track listing
| extra_column = Album
| title1          = Neither of Us Can See
| extra1           = Stealth (Soundtrack)
| length1         = 4:04
| title2          = Look Alive
| extra2           = Light Grenades (Japanese edition)
| length2         = 4:21
| title3          = While All the Vultures Feed
| extra3          = Monuments and Melodies
| length3         = 3:53
| title4          = Pantomime (Altered Version)
| extra4          = Monuments and Melodies
| length4         = 4:39
| title5          = Anything
| extra5          = Morning View unreleased track
| length5         = 3:32
| title6          = Punch Drunk
| extra6           = Light Grenades (Japanese edition)
| length6         = 5:14
| title7          = Admiration
| extra7           = Stealth (Soundtrack)| length7         = 4:13
| title8          = Martini
| extra8           = Monuments and Melodies| length8         = 4:09
| title9          = A Certain Shade of Green (Live acoustic version)
| extra9           = S.C.I.E.N.C.E. / Monuments and Melodies| length9         = 3:36 
| title10         = Monuments and Melodies
| extra10          = Megalomaniac| length10        = 5:06
| title11         = Let's Go Crazy (Prince cover)
| extra11          = Purple Rain / Monuments and Melodies
| length11        = 4:29
}}

Charts

Credits
Brandon Boyd – lead vocals; djembe (on "New Skin"), album cover
Mike Einziger – guitar, backing vocals, occasional keyboards
Alex Katunich – bass (on all tracks of S.C.I.E.N.C.E., Make Yourself, & Morning View)
José Pasillas – drums
DJ Lyfe – turntables (on "New Skin")
Chris Kilmore – turntables, keyboards, synthesizers, piano, theremin on all tracks except "New Skin".
Ben Kenney – bass, backing vocals (on all tracks of A Crow Left of the Murder..., Megalomaniac, Halo 2 Original Soundtrack, Stealth soundtrack, Light Grenades, & Monuments and Melodies'')

References

Incubus (band) albums
2009 greatest hits albums
Epic Records compilation albums